Jiří Fleišman (born 2 October 1984) is a Czech football defender currently playing for Baník Ostrava.

References

External links 
 
 
 Guardian Stats Centre

1984 births
Living people
Sportspeople from Most (city)
Czech footballers
Czech Republic international footballers
Czech First League players
FC Slovan Liberec players
FK Mladá Boleslav players
Association football defenders
FC Baník Ostrava players